Metarbela bifasciata is a moth in the family Cossidae. It is found in Nigeria.

References

Natural History Museum Lepidoptera generic names catalog

Endemic fauna of Nigeria
Metarbelinae
Moths described in 1929